Dong Seidu (born 26 August 1970) is a Ghanaian boxer. He competed in the men's light welterweight event at the 1992 Summer Olympics.

References

1970 births
Living people
Ghanaian male boxers
Olympic boxers of Ghana
Boxers at the 1992 Summer Olympics
Place of birth missing (living people)
Light-welterweight boxers